USS Vicksburg was a  light cruiser of the United States Navy, which were built during World War II. The class was designed as a development of the earlier s, the size of which had been limited by the First London Naval Treaty. The start of the war led to the dissolution of the treaty system, but the dramatic need for new vessels precluded a new design, so the Clevelands used the same hull as their predecessors, but were significantly heavier. The Clevelands carried a main battery of twelve  guns in four three-gun turrets, along with a secondary armament of twelve  dual-purpose guns.

Vicksburg was first laid down as Cheyenne on 26 October 1942 at Newport News Shipbuilding & Dry Dock Company, Newport News, Virginia, but, exactly one month later, was renamed Vicksburg. The light cruiser was launched on 14 December 1943; sponsored by Miss Muriel Hamilton, the daughter of Mayor J. C. Hamilton, of Vicksburg, Mississippi; and commissioned at the Norfolk Navy Yard on 12 June 1944, with Captain William C. Vose in command. Vicksburg received two battle stars for her World War II service.

Design

Following the start of World War II in September 1939, Britain announced it would suspend the treaty for the duration of the conflict, a decision the US Navy quickly followed. Though still neutral, the United States recognized that war was likely and the urgent need for additional ships ruled out an entirely new design, so the Clevelands were a close development of the earlier s, the chief difference being the substitution of a two-gun  dual-purpose gun mount for one of the main battery  gun turrets.

The ship was powered by four General Electric steam turbines, each driving one propeller shaft, using steam provided by four oil-fired Babcock & Wilcox boilers. Her crew numbered 1285 officers and enlisted men.

The ship was armed with a main battery of twelve 6 in /47 caliber Mark 16 guns in four 3-gun turrets on the centerline. Two were placed forward in a superfiring pair; the other two turrets were placed aft of the superstructure in another superfiring pair. The secondary battery consisted of twelve  /38 caliber dual-purpose guns mounted in twin turrets. Two of these were placed on the centerline, one directly behind the forward main turrets and the other just forward of the aft turrets. Two more were placed abreast of the conning tower and the other pair on either side of the aft superstructure. Anti-aircraft defense consisted of twenty-eight Bofors  guns in four quadruple and six double mounts and ten Oerlikon  guns in single mounts.

The main battery turrets were protected with  faces and  sides and tops, and they were supported by barbettes 6 inches thick. Vicksburgs conning tower had 5-inch sides.

Service history

Construction and initial service

Vicksburg was built by the Newport News Shipbuilding & Dry Dock Company of Newport News, Virginia. She was laid down on 26 October 1942, originally under the name Cheyenne, but was launched as Vicksburg on 14 December 1943 with the hull number CL-86. The ship's name was changed after one of her sisters, which had initially been given the name Vicksburg, was renamed  to commemorate the heavy cruiser of the same name that had been sunk at the Battle of Sunda Strait in 1942. After completing fitting-out work, Vicksburg was commissioned on 12 June 1944. Work to prepare the ship to go to sea lasted into July, when she began her initial sea trials in Chesapeake Bay. On 7 August, she got underway for her shakedown cruise that took the ship as far south as the British West Indies and included training operations in the Gulf of Paria from 12 to 30 August. During this period, she was based in Trinidad.

Vicksburg arrived in Hampton Roads, Virginia, where she participated in radar training on 9 September to familiarize her radar operators with identifying and tracking aerial and surface contacts. The next day, she conducted shooting practice with a drone off Cape May. On 11 September, she entered the dry dock at the Boston Navy Yard for an overhaul that lasted until 24 September. She thereafter took part in further trials held off Rockland, Maine, and radiation tests in Boston. From 5 October to 15 December, Vicksburg served as a training ship for crews of large warships that were awaiting commissioning. During this period, she operated in Narragansett Bay, Block Island Sound, and Long Island Sound. The ship thereafter sailed south to Norfolk for periodic maintenance at the Norfolk Navy Yard, arriving there on 17 December. She conducted a set of trials on 30–31 December, before departing on 1 January 1945, bound for the Pacific. They passed through the Panama Canal on 5 January and docked at Balboa, Panama, at on the other end of the canal. There, TG 21.12 was disbanded. Vicksburg sailed for Pearl Harbor the next day and arrived there on 17 January; there, she took part in combat practice that included air defense training that consisted of drone target practice, radar detection, and coordination with defending fighter aircraft.

Pacific Theater operations

Battle of Iwo Jima
On 5 February, Vicksburg got underway, bound for Saipan in the Mariana Islands, which she reached eight days later. While there, she refueled from the oiler  as the fleet made preparations for the upcoming invasion of Iwo Jima. Vicksburg was assigned to TG 52.19, which sortied on 14 February. The next day, Vicksburg was transferred to Task Unit 54.9.2., part of the shore bombardment unit. Vicksburg, Chester, and Pensacola took up their positions at 06:51 the next morning, and at 07:09, Vicksburg launched one of her Vought OS2U Kingfisher seaplanes to help direct her fire. Poor weather hampered the aircrews' ability to observe the ship's fire, but Vicksburg nevertheless carried out the bombardment for almost an hour, ceasing fire at 08:08.

After recovering and refueling her Kingfisher, Vicksburg resumed her bombardment at 09:47, but low visibility still interfered. During a third bombardment later that day, the heavy cloud cover dissipated and permitted much more effective shooting. During this period, at 14:14, a Japanese A6M5 Zero attacked Vicksburgs spotter, but another Kingfisher from Pensacola shot the Japanese fighter down, allowing Vicksburgs aircraft to continue supporting the cruiser. At around 14:45, the ship ceased fire again and recovered her Kingfisher. A fourth and final bombardment mission began at 16:18 and concluded at 17:27. Vicksburg and the rest of TG 52.19 departed for the evening. The ships continued to operate off Iwo Jima more than two weeks, providing fire support to the marines fighting to occupy the island. The unit carried out a raid on the island of Okidaitōjima on 2 March. the  On 5 March, Vicksburg left for the fleet's base at Ulithi to replenish ammunition and stores. While there, she was transferred to Task Force 58, the fast carrier task force, and was assigned to TG 58.1, one of the subordinate carrier battle groups. The task force sortied on 14 March to carry out air strikes in preparation for the upcoming invasion of Okinawa.

Okinawa campaign and end of the war
In the early hours of 18 March, as the carriers began their attacks on Japanese positions in the home islands, a Japanese Mitsubishi G4M1 bomber attempted a torpedo attack on Vicksburg. Another Japanese aircraft dropped flares nearby about twenty minutes later before being driven off by anti-aircraft fire from the American fleet; shortly thereafter, it passed back through the American formation and was shot down by the combined fire of several ships, including Vicksburg. Further Japanese attacks took place through the morning. A Yokosuka P1Y land-based bomber attempted to dive on one of the carriers, but was shot down by heavy American fire. Some two hours later, a Yokosuka D4Y dive bomber flew over Vicksburg; the cruisers' light gunners scored three hits before the aircraft was shot down by 5-inch fire from other vessels—potentially Miami or the destroyer —brought the aircraft down. Over the following days, the American carriers struck many targets in Japan, prompting heavy Japanese counter-attacks. During this period, Vicksburg shot down a total of eight Japanese aircraft. She also used her Kingfisher to recover an American pilot who had been shot down off the Japanese coast.

When the invasion of Okinawa began on 1 April, Vicksburg returned to coastal bombardment duties. The ship supported the American advance across the southern half of the island, targeting defensive strongpoints, fortified caves, and other defensive positions. She fired thousands of rounds from her 6-inch and 5-inch batteries, at times engaging Japanese positions a few hundred yards from American positions. She nevertheless remained attached to TG 58.1 during the campaign. In the final stage of the fighting on Okinawa, Vicksburg was detached to escort minesweepers clearing Japanese minefields in the East China Sea. These operations concluded on 24 June, and Vicksburg thereafter went to the Philippines. The unit, part of TF 95, was used to patrol off Okinawa and make raids into the East China Sea to interdict Japanese shipping in the area, though Vicksburg saw no serious action during this period.

Vicksburg later returned to the Philippines, where she lay when the Japanese surrendered on 15 August. The ships rendezvoused with the fast carrier strike force, which had by then passed to 3rd Fleet command and been re-numbered TF 38, and on 24 August, Vicksburg was assigned to TG 38.2. The unit remained outside Tokyo Bay in late August and into September, where the formal surrender ceremony was carried out aboard the fast battleship  on 2 September. Vicksburg and the rest of the task group then entered the bay on 5 September. The cruiser became the flagship of Cruiser Division 10, commanded by Rear Admiral Lloyd J. Wiltse. Vicksburg and other elements of TF 38 departed for Okinawa on 20 September, where the ship embarked some 2,200 passengers bound for the United States.

Over the course of the ship's participation in World War II, Vicksburg earned two battle stars.

Post-War
Vicksburg and the other ships arrived in Hawaii on 4 October, remaining there for five days before departing for California. The ships arrived in San Francisco Bay, California, on 15 October, passing through a naval review as they entered the port. On 26 October, Vicksburg moved to Monterey Bay, California, for the Navy Day celebration the next day. She then sailed for Long Beach, California, where she remained from 31 October to 6 November, when she departed for Portland, Oregon. There, she took part in the Armistice Day celebration on 11 November. The ship then returned to Long Beach five days later, where she remained through the end of the year. On 17 January 1946, Vicksburg was drydocked at the Terminal Island Naval Shipyard in Long Beach, California, for a thorough overhaul and modernization. After returning to service, she became the flagship of Third Fleet, commanded by Vice Admiral (VAdm)  Frederick C. Sherman. The ship moved to Naval Air Station San Diego, where Third Fleet was based. In September, VAdm Alfred E. Montgomery temporarily made Vicksburg his flagship. The cruiser was decommissioned on 30 June 1947 as part of the post-war reduction in fleet strength, and she was allocated to the reserve fleet for the next fifteen years. She was stricken from the naval register on 1 October 1962 and sold to the National Metal and Steel Corporation of Terminal Island, California, on 25 August 1964. There, she was broken up.

Footnotes

Notes

Citations

References

External links

 

 

Cleveland-class cruisers
World War II cruisers of the United States
Ships built in Newport News, Virginia
1943 ships